Boyd School is a brick Italianate style one-room school house built in 1889, in Holmes County, Ohio.  It was used as a schoolhouse until 1962.  The brick building replaced another building that was built during the American Civil War.  It is the only preserved one-room schoolhouse in the county.  It is located northwest of Berlin on the Fryburg-Fredericksbury-Boyd Road.

It was listed on the National Register of Historic Places in 1980.

References

School buildings on the National Register of Historic Places in Ohio
Italianate architecture in Ohio
School buildings completed in 1889
Buildings and structures in Holmes County, Ohio
National Register of Historic Places in Holmes County, Ohio
One-room schoolhouses in Ohio